Anders Nilsen may refer to:

Anders Nilsen (cartoonist) (born 1973), American cartoonist 
Anders Nilsen (musician) (born 1988), Norwegian singer, songwriter and music producer
Anders Nilsen Næsset (1872–1949), Norwegian fisherman and MP
Anders Nilsen Wiborg (1655–1718), fourth commander of the Christiansfjell Fortress in Norway

See also
Anders Nielsen (disambiguation)
Anders Nilsson (disambiguation)